Yesterday's Hero is a 1979 British drama film directed by Neil Leifer and starring Ian McShane, Suzanne Somers, Adam Faith, Paul Nicholas and Cary Elwes (in his film debut). It also features Glynis Barber and Emma Samms in their early performances. The screenplay was written by novelist Jackie Collins, but was an original work and not based on one of her books. Although it has echoes of the life of the former player George Best, the film is not biographical.

Plot
Former star football player Rod Turner is now an alcoholic and playing in non-league football. Third Division club "The Saints", owned by pop star Clint Simon, are on a cup run and win their quarter finals match when their star striker is injured. Unable to find a suitable replacement player from another club, Simon has the idea of hiring his childhood idol Turner, over the protests of team coach Jake Marsh. Simon approaches Turner and takes him on a trip to Paris, where he meets his old flame Cloudy, a singer who is making a record with Simon. Turner accepts the offer and, after training with the team, plays in the semi final match but he is caught drinking at half-time in the dressing room by the coach Jake Marsh and banned from playing in the final. Turner is also torn between his girlfriend Susan and Cloudy, who takes Turner in after another drinking episode. Turner is on the bench in the final, but comes on as substitute to score the winning goal and clinch the cup.

Cast
 Ian McShane as Rod Turner 
 Suzanne Somers as Cloudy Martin 
 Adam Faith as Jake Marsh 
 Paul Nicholas as Clint Simon 
 Sam Kydd as Sam Turner 
 Glynis Barber as Susan 
 Trevor Thomas as Speed 
 Sandy Ratcliff as Rita 
 Alan Lake as Georgie Moore 
 Matthew Long as Mack Gill 
 Paul J. Medford as Marek 
 Paul Desbois as Butch 
 Eric Deacon as Chris 
 George Moon as Changing Room Attendant 
 Jack Haig as Sam's Crony 
 Damian Elwes as Disco Dancer 
 Cary Elwes as Disco Dancer 
 John Motson as himself: TV Interviewer / Commentator

References

External links

 
 

1979 films
British association football films
Films scored by Stanley Myers
1970s English-language films
1970s British films